Revertigo is a Swedish rock duo consisting of singer Mats Levén, who is known for his work with heavy metal bands such as Candlemass and Therion, and Treat guitarist Anders Wikström. The group was formed in 2016, and they produced a three-song demo tape that led to the band being signed by Frontiers Records. Their debut album was released on 23 February, 2018 through Frontiers.

Members
 Mats Levén – vocals
 Anders Wikström – guitar

Discography
 Revertigo (2018, Frontiers)

References

External links
Facebook

Swedish rock music groups
Musical groups established in 2016
Musical groups from Stockholm
Frontiers Records artists
2016 establishments in Sweden